Oscar Travis Delp is an American football tight end for the Georgia Bulldogs of the Southeastern Conference.

Early life and high school
Delp grew up in Cumming, Georgia and attended West Forsyth High School. As a junior, he caught 43 passes for 730 yards and 9 touchdowns. Delp had 59 receptions for 923 yards and 8 touchdowns in his senior season and was selected to play in the 2022 All-American Bowl. Delp was rated a four-star recruit and committed to play college football at Georgia over offers from South Carolina, Michigan, and Clemson. Delp also played lacrosse at West Forsyth.

College career
Delp joined the Georgia Bulldogs as an early enrollee in January 2022. He participated in spring practices and led all receivers in Georgia's annual spring game with seven receptions and 91 receiving yards. Delp entered his freshman season as the team's fourth tight end. He saw his first significant playing time in the Bulldogs' third game of the season against South Carolina and caught two passes for 32 yards and one touchdown in a 48-7 win.

References

External links
Georgia Bulldogs bio

Living people
American football tight ends
Georgia Bulldogs football players
Players of American football from Georgia (U.S. state)
Year of birth missing (living people)